Merijärvi is a municipality of Finland.

It is located in the province of Oulu and is part of the Northern Ostrobothnia region.

The municipality is unilingually Finnish.

Notable people
Juhani Alaranta, an ex-member of parliament
Erkki Haukipuro, a late member of parliament, minister and governor
Alvar Saukko, an ex-member of parliament
Tuomas Myllylä, a cartoon artist

References

External links

Municipality of Merijärvi – Official website 

 
Populated places established in 1866
1866 establishments in the Russian Empire